Ezekiel 11 is the eleventh chapter of the Book of Ezekiel in the Hebrew Bible or the Old Testament of the Christian Bible. This book contains the prophecies attributed to the prophet/priest Ezekiel, and is one of the Books of the Prophets. In this chapter, Ezekiel pronounces judgment on Jerusalem's "wicked counsellors" and promises that God will restore Israel.

Text
The original text was written in the Hebrew language. This chapter is divided into 25 verses.

Textual witnesses
Some early manuscripts containing the text of this chapter in Hebrew are of the Masoretic Text tradition, which includes the Codex Cairensis (895), the Petersburg Codex of the Prophets (916), Aleppo Codex (10th century), and Codex Leningradensis (1008). Fragments containing parts of this chapter were found among the Dead Sea Scrolls including 4Q73 (4QEzek; 50–25 BCE) with extant verses 1–3, 5–11; and 11Q4 (11QEzek; 50 BCE–50 CE) with the extant verse 19.

There is also a translation into Koine Greek known as the Septuagint, made in the last few centuries BC. Extant ancient manuscripts of the Septuagint version include Codex Vaticanus (B; B; 4th century), Codex Alexandrinus (A; A; 5th century) and Codex Marchalianus (Q; Q; 6th century).

Evil in high places (11:1–12)

Verse 1
 Moreover the spirit lifted me up,
 and brought me unto the east gate of the Lord's house, which looketh eastward:
 and behold at the door of the gate five and twenty men;
 among whom I saw Jaazaniah the son of Azur,
 and Pelatiah the son of Benaiah, princes of the people.
In his vision, Ezekiel moves from the northern gateway of the temple's inner court (14) to the east gate. The 25 men who are assembled there are "evidently a separate group" from the group of "about twenty-five men" who assembled at the inner court's northern entrance, as this group are condemned for their wicked counsel whereas the earlier group are condemned for their sun-worship.
 
 "Jaazaniah, the son of Azur" is not to be confused with "Jaazaniah, the son of Saphan", mentioned in Ezekiel 8:11. A seal dated to 7th century BC with the name "Jaazaniah" has been found, although the exact identification to which Jaazaniah is difficult.
 "Pelatiah" (Hebrew: פלטיהו ; Greek: Φαλτιας, Φαλεττι(α); Pelatyahu or Pelatyah): means "whom Jehovah delivered". His death, which occurred on hearing Ezekiel's prophecy, is noted in Ezekiel 11:13.

A promise of restoration (11:13–21)

Verse 13
Now it happened, while I was prophesying, that Pelatiah the son of Benaiah died. Then I fell on my face and cried with a loud voice, and said, “Ah, Lord God! Will You make a complete end of the remnant of Israel?”
 "While I was prophesying" is interpreted as "as soon as I had finished" in the Easy-to-Read Version.
 "Pelatiah the son of Benaiah": Mentioned in Ezekiel 11:1 as a 'principal man among the twenty-five princes, who made all the mischief in Jerusalem' (cf. Ezekiel 11:2). Although it seems to be a vision at the time (as the slaying of the ancient men in Ezekiel 9:6), but it was a prophecy that would be done in fact, so the prophet thought this as a part of the common destruction on all the inhabitants of the Jerusalem, and he 'earnestly deprecated' that severe judgment (cf. Ezekiel 9:8).<ref name=benson>Benson, Joseph. [http://biblehub.com/commentaries/benson/ezekiel/11.htm '’Commentary on the Old and New Testaments. Ezekiel 11.] Accessed 9 Juli 2019.</ref>

God’s glory leaves Jerusalem (11:22–24)
Verse 22Then did the cherubims lift up their wings, and the wheels beside them; and the glory of the God of Israel was over them above."Cherub" (plural: Cherubim) is defined in Brown-Driver-Briggs as "the living chariot of the theophanic God". Lutheran theologian Wilhelm Gesenius describes it as "a being of a sublime and celestial nature".

The "mountain which is on the east side of the city": is interpreted by New Oxford Annotated Bible as "the Mount of Olives".

Verse 24Then the Spirit took me up and brought me in a vision by the Spirit of God into Chaldea, to those in captivity. And the vision that I had seen went up from me.''
Some versions refer to Babylonia rather than Chaldea. The International Standard Version explains that at this point, "the vision that I had been observing ended", concluding an account which commenced in chapter 8.

See also
 Cherub
 Jaazaniah the son of Azur
 Jerusalem
 Pelatiah the son of Benaiah
 Judah
 Mercy seat
 Shekinah
 Temple of Solomon
Related Bible parts: Leviticus 18, Isaiah 6, Ezekiel 1, Luke 2, Romans 12

Notes

References

Bibliography

External links

Jewish
Ezekiel 11 Hebrew with Parallel English
Ezekiel 11 Hebrew with Rashi's Commentary

Christian
Ezekiel 11 English Translation with Parallel Latin Vulgate

11
Cherubim